Dweepa is a 2002 Indian Kannada-language film by Girish Kasaravalli, based on the novel of the same name by Na D'Souza. It stars Soundarya, Avinash and M. V. Vasudeva Rao in the lead roles. The film deals with the raging issue of building dams and the displacement of natives. It won two National Film Awards, four Karnataka State Film Awards and three Filmfare Awards South.

Plot
Located in the backwaters of a dam, Sita Parvata is a low-lying island slowly submerging due to the incessant rains. The government succeeds in evacuating the residents by giving them compensation for the properties they own. The temple priest Duggajja, his son Ganapa, and daughter-in-law Nagi find it impossible to leave their homeland and make a living with the meagre compensation. They have but a small hut, which earns them a compensation of 25,000. In Ganapa's own words, the compensation can give them food and shelter, but cannot compensate for the love and respect of their people. On the island, they are respected people, but outside, they would be one among hundreds of families struggling to make a living. Centered on this complex theme, the film narrates the struggles of the family and how ultimately in the end they manage to continue life on the island.

Cast 
 Soundarya as Nagi
 Avinash as Ganapa
 M. V. Vasudeva Rao as Duggajja
 Harish Raj as Krishna
 Purushottama Talavata
 Siddaraj Kalyankar
 Malati
 Vijayasarathy
 Radha Ramachandra
 Sringeri Ramanna
 Sawant

Production

Development and filming 
Upon being impressed by Na D'Souza novel Dweepa, Girish Kasaravalli narrated the story to Soundarya who decided to adapt it into a film and that she would produce it. Filming began in August 2000 but was temporarily stalled due to events surrounding the abduction of Rajkumar. As heavy rains were intrinsic to the plot of the film, shooting had to be further postponed to the following monsoons due to inadequate rainfall that year in Karnataka. Kasaravalli shuttled up and down to Linganamakki Dam area, and the surrounding villages Bellenne and Taleguppa with his crew, trying to get the rainy days on film. Filming completed and was ready for release in December 2001. With author D'Souza's consent, changes in the plot were made in the adaptation. The human dimension of the interaction between characters were put to the forefront of the story, with the social concern around the plot being made secondary. The film was first screened at the International Film Festival of Kerala in April 2002. Kasaravalli also showed it to the film appreciation course students of the Film and Television Institute of India, Pune, and received good responses from them.

Theme and inspiration 
Kasaravalli said he "read the book and liked the theme very much." He added, "It is all about how people's lives change completely when the land around them gets submerged. It is not just about physical change and survival, but about changes in culture, value systems and even basic self-confidence, caused by circumstances beyond a person's control." Thematically, the film was observed by critics as similar to his previous films, that of "human relationships and struggles". Alienation is another theme in the film that Kasaravalli depicted, like in his previous works, Ghatashraddha (1977) and Mane (1990). The female protagonist in Dweepa had an optimistic outlook on life as opposed to her husband's abject resignation to his fate. Critic Srikanth of Deccan Herald wrote, "As always, Dweepa has a woman protagonist who represents strength, optimism and pragmatism signifying the growth of the today's 'new age woman'. The film celebrates Nagi's inner strength, which is also the beauty of human nature. Through Nagi's characterisation, director Kasaravalli hopes to prove that women are capable of unselfish love and facing life courageously." Barring the main characters, he identifies an outsider and the water as two other characters on the film; represents the world on the other side of the river as opposed to the central character's dwelling, and the latter lending a metaphoric voice to Dweepa." He added, "Rarely have the rains been brought to the foreground as a character. But here, it represents some kind of a hope as well as fear as is visible."

Reception 
Srikanth of Deccan Herald felt the film was "quite engaging and briskly paced." He added that the cinematographer H. M. Ramachandra "certainly deserves a lot of credit for capturing the picturesque locales of Malnad in its splendour." He commended the acting performances and wrote, "Soundarya ... has certainly come of age. She has bloomed into a fine actress and a natural performer besides producing the film herself. Kasaravalli has drawn a superb performance from Avinash, who has portrayed his character with panache. The late Vasudeva Rao has put up a spirited performance. Harish Raju comes as a whiff of fresh air in the film. It is an out and out Kasaravalli film with a lot of surprises!"

Awards and screenings
49th National Film Awards
 National Film Award for Best Feature Film – Soundarya
 National Film Award for Best Cinematography – H. M. Ramachandra Halkere

2001–02 Karnataka State Film Awards
 Best Film – Soundarya
 Best Direction – Girish Kasaravalli
 Best Actress in a lead role – Soundarya
 Best Cinematography – H. M. Ramachandra Halkere

50th Filmfare Awards South
 Best Film – Soundarya
 Best Direction – Girish Kasaravalli
 Best Actress in a Lead Role – Soundarya

Screenings
 Human Rights Watch International Film Festival, New York
 33rd International Film Festival of India
 Fukuoka Film Festival, Japan
 Durban International Film Festival
 International Film Festival of Rotterdam
 Cinema Vintage Programme, IsolaCinema, KinoOtok
 Moscow International Film Festival

Soundtrack
Unlike earlier Kasaravalli films, Dweepa had music by Thomas Isaac Kottukapally used throughout.

References

External links
 

2000s Kannada-language films
2002 films
Best Feature Film National Film Award winners
Films whose cinematographer won the Best Cinematography National Film Award
Kannada literature
Films directed by Girish Kasaravalli